St. Louis Church was a historic former Roman Catholic church, located at 440 Bradford Avenue in Fall River, Massachusetts.  The Gothic Revival church was built in 1885 to the designs of James Murphy. It was added to the National Register of Historic Places in 1983. The Diocese of Fall River closed the parish in 2001, and the records were transferred to St. Mary's Cathedral (Cathedral of Saint Mary of the Assumption).

The church was demolished in April 2010 for a cultural center that has yet to be built.

See also
National Register of Historic Places listings in Fall River, Massachusetts

References

St Barnabas Anglican Church, Broadway

Churches on the National Register of Historic Places in Massachusetts
Roman Catholic churches in Fall River, Massachusetts
James Murphy (architect) buildings
Roman Catholic churches completed in 1885
National Register of Historic Places in Fall River, Massachusetts
19th-century Roman Catholic church buildings in the United States
Buildings and structures demolished in 2010
Demolished buildings and structures in Massachusetts